Evan Herbert Walker  (11 October 1935 – 16 February 2015) was an Australian politician.

Evan Walker was born in Melbourne to Charles Fitzroy Walker, the headmaster of Box Hill Grammar School, and Ethel Ingamells. He attended his father's school and then Melbourne High School, graduating with a Bachelor of Architecture in 1959 from the University of Melbourne. He studied at the University of Toronto on a Commonwealth scholarship, receiving a Master of Architecture in 1962. He practised in Australia from 1963, but returned to Canada from 1965 to 1969, where he also tutored at Toronto University.

In 1971 he worked as an architect on the Elliston Estate in Rosanna.

In 1969 Walker joined the Labor Party. He was elected to the Victorian Legislative Council for Melbourne in 1979, immediately becoming Deputy Opposition Leader in the upper house. Following Labor's victory in 1982, he became Deputy Leader of the Government in the Legislative Council, as well as Minister for Conservation and for Planning. In 1983 he added Public Works, and in 1985 shifted to Agriculture and Rural Affairs. He was Industry Minister from 1988 to 1989 and Major Projects and Arts Minister from 1989 to 1990.

Walker retired from politics in 1992, remaining active in Melbourne University's architecture faculty until 2000. In the 1996 Australia Day Honours he was made an Officer of the Order of Australia for "service to architecture, town planning and the Victorian Parliament". He was awarded the Centenary Medal on 1 January 2001 for "service to planning and urban design in Victoria.

Walker died in February 2015, aged 79.

The Southbank Pedestrian Bridge was subsequently renamed as Evan Walker Bridge, recognising the late Prof Walker’s role in creating the Southbank precinct.

References

1935 births
2015 deaths
Members of the Victorian Legislative Council
Victorian Ministers for the Environment
Architects from Melbourne
University of Melbourne alumni
University of Toronto alumni
Academic staff of the University of Melbourne
Australian Labor Party members of the Parliament of Victoria
Officers of the Order of Australia
Victorian Ministers for Agriculture